Mohammad Hassan Mirza Qajar (20 November 1899 – 7 January 1943) was the brother of Ahmad Shah Qajar of Iran, and former Crown Prince of the Qajar dynasty. Soon after Reza Shah deposed the Qajar dynasty and made himself Shah of Iran in 1925, Prince Mohammad Hassan and his family were sent into permanent exile to England. In 1930, he declared himself the rightful heir to the crown as pretender to the throne. He died on 7 January 1943 in Maidenhead, England and was buried in Kerbala, Iraq.

Tension with Ahmad Shah Qajar 
Even before the dethronement of his brother Ahmad Shah Qajar by Reza Shah, he was still an inconsequential figure in Iranian politics. This was not from a lack of trying however; in early March 1921, Mohammad Hassan Mirza approached the British legation with proposals to supplant his brother, the king of Iran at the time. The High Commissioner's office in Baghdad informed Herman Norman in a telegram that Zia'eddin Tabatabaee informed them that Mohammad Hassan Mirza was "very dissatisfied with the shah and fears for safety of Persia from the Bolsheviks...", and that "he [Mohammad Hassan Mirza] is prepared to form new government as he considers the Shah useless...". Mohammad Hassan Mirza proposals were ignored, except by Percy Cox who was the former attache of Britain in Iran. Herman Norman who was current British diplomat to Iran thought of the dethronement of Ahmad Shah Qajar by his brother as a tactical mistake which would divide Persia; "[I am prevented] from encouraging any movement which has for its object dethronement of His Majesty. It is also my duty to do my best to preserve the unity of Persia".

Honours
 Persian Empire:
 Member 1st Class of the Order of the Lion and the Sun
 Member 1st Class of the Order of the Crown of Persia
 Kingdom of Egypt: Grand Cordon of the Order of Muhammad 'Ali, (1921)
 Monaco: Grand Cross of the Order of Saint-Charles, (14 January 1915)

Offspring
 Prince Soltan Hosein Mirza (25 August 1916, Tabriz-1986, Canada)
 Prince Soltan Hamid Mirza (23 April 1918, Tabriz-5 May 1988, London)
 Prince Rokn al-Din Mirza (1923, Tehran-1996, Canada)
 Princess Shmas Aghdas (1919, Tehran-1991, Paris)
 Princess Giti Afruz (1922, Tehran-2022, New York City)

Government Positions Held
 Governor-General of Azerbaijan (1918)

References

External links

Qajar princes
1899 births
1943 deaths
Heads of the Qajar Imperial Family
Iranian royalty
Iranian emigrants to the United Kingdom
Qajar pretenders to the Iranian throne
Iranian exiles
Grand Crosses of the Order of Saint-Charles
Qajar governors